Rayk Haucke is a Paralympian athlete from Germany competing mainly in category P11 pentathlon events.	
	
He competed in the 1996 Summer Paralympics in Atlanta, United States.  There he won a silver medal in the men's Pentathlon - P10 event and finished fourth in the men's Javelin throw - F10 event.  He also competed at the 2000 Summer Paralympics in Sydney, Australia.    There he won a silver medal in the men's Javelin throw - F11 event, a bronze medal in the men's Pentathlon - P11 event and finished fourth in the men's 4 x 400 metre relay - T13 event.  He also competed at the 2004 Summer Paralympics in Athens, Greece.  There he finished seventh in the men's Javelin throw - F11 event and went out in the first round of the men's 4 x 100 metre relay - T11-13 event

External links
 

Paralympic athletes of Germany
Athletes (track and field) at the 1996 Summer Paralympics
Athletes (track and field) at the 2000 Summer Paralympics
Athletes (track and field) at the 2004 Summer Paralympics
Paralympic silver medalists for Germany
Paralympic bronze medalists for Germany
Living people
Medalists at the 1996 Summer Paralympics
Medalists at the 2000 Summer Paralympics
Year of birth missing (living people)
Paralympic medalists in athletics (track and field)
German male javelin throwers
German pentathletes
Visually impaired javelin throwers
Paralympic javelin throwers